René van Rijswijk (born 3 January 1971) is a Dutch former footballer who played as a forward for RKC Waalwijk, SC Cambuur and NEC. During his playing career, Van Rijswijk was a recognisable figure due to his long hair, which he wore in a ponytail. He was also known for his relatively low goalscoring output, which earned him the nickname "De spits zonder doelpunten" ("The striker without goals").

References

1971 births
Living people
Footballers from Rotterdam
Dutch footballers
Association football forwards
RKC Waalwijk players
SC Cambuur players
NEC Nijmegen players
Eredivisie players
Eerste Divisie players